The Avi Chai Foundation is a private foundation endowed in 1984 by Zalman Bernstein, a well-known successful investor and founder of Sanford Bernstein. Zalman Bernstein became a Modern Orthodox Baal teshuva (a returnee to Orthodox observance) who wished to further the cause of outreach to alienated and assimilated Jews worldwide. Avi Chai allocates resources in the United States and in Israel. Until 2003, Avi Chai functioned in Russia and other former Soviet Union countries.

The foundation is preparing to spend-down its remaining endowment by 2020.  , the endowment had a value of $600 million.

Board 

Avi Chai's Board has included :

 Mem D. Bernstein, Chairman of the Board
 Arthur W. Fried
 Samuel "Buddy" Silberman (Trustee Emeritus)
 Dr. Meir Buzaglo
 Lauren K. Merkin
 Henry Taub (Trustee Emeritus, died 2011)
 Dr. Avital Darmon
 George Rohr
 Dr. Ruth R. Wisse
 Alan R. Feld,  Senior Managing Director of Sanford Bernstein’s private client business.
 Lief D. Rosenblatt

References

External links
 

Foundations based in the United States
Jewish organizations established in 1984
Orthodox Jewish outreach
Jewish organizations based in the United States